The East Tennessee State Buccaneers college football team represents the East Tennessee State University as a member of the Southern Conference (SoCon). The Buccaneers competes as part of the NCAA Division I Football Bowl Subdivision. The program has had 19 head coaches since it began play during the 1920 season. Since December 2021, George Quarles has served as head coach at East Tennessee State.

Since 1920, three coaches have led the Buccaneers in postseason bowl games: Star Wood, Hal Littleford, and John Robert Bell. Mike Cavan and Sanders have led East Tennessee State to appearances in the NCAA Division I Football Championship Subdivision playoffs. Three of coaches have also won conference championships: Gene McMurray captured one as a member of the Smoky Mountain Conference; Bell captured one as a member of the  Ohio Valley Conference; and Sanders two as a member of the Southern Conference.

Wood is the leader in seasons coached and games won, with 65 victories during his 13 years with the program. Sanders has the highest winning percentage of those who have coached more than one game, with .619. Jack S. Batey has the lowest winning percentage of those who have coached more than one game, with .143.

Key

Coaches

Notes

References

Lists of college football head coaches

Tennessee sports-related lists